The World Athletics Half Marathon Championships is a biennial international half marathon competition organised by World Athletics. The competition was launched as the IAAF World Half Marathon Championships in 1992 and held annually until 2010. It was renamed the IAAF World Road Running Championships in 2006 and reduced in distance to a 20K run, but reverted to the half marathon distance the following year and to the original competition name the year after that. The competition was renamed to its current title in 2020 after the governing body rebranded itself moving away from the long-standing International Association of Athletics Federations (IAAF) moniker.

The competition replaced the female-only IAAF World Women's Road Race Championships, which was held annually from 1983 to 1991.

The next Championship will be held as part of the 2023 World Athletics Road Running Championships.

Editions
Key

History
The IAAF World Half Marathon Championships was first held in 1992. It comprised three races: the men's race, the women's race and the junior men's race. Furthermore, a team competition was held in each category, with the winners being decided by combining the performances of a country's top three finishers. The country with the lowest aggregate time won the team competition. The junior men's race was held in only the first and second editions, and was removed from the programme from 1994 onwards.

The competition went largely unchanged until 2006, when the competition was renamed as the IAAF World Road Running Championships. Aside from the name change, the significant difference was the distance of the race, changing from a half marathon to a 20 kilometres road race. The 20 km race featured only at the 2006 edition, and the half marathon distance returned for the 2007 World Road Running Championships.

On 29 November 2007, the IAAF announced that the name of the competition would revert to its original title of the IAAF World Half Marathon Championships, beginning with the 2008 IAAF World Half Marathon Championships in Rio de Janeiro, Brazil on 12 October 2008.

This competition should not to be confused with the IAAF World Women's Road Race Championships which were run from 1983 to 1991, or the IAAF World Road Relay Championships which took place between 1992 and 1998.

The 2020 edition of the competition was postponed due to the COVID-19 pandemic.  Although it was held later that year, many countries, including Australia, Canada, Japan, New Zealand, and the U.S., declined to participate.

Similarly, the 2022 edition of the competition was postponed twice before being cancelled due to the pandemic.  As a result of the cancellation, the World Athletics Council decided to award the 2027 World Athletics Road Running Championships to Yangzhou, the city originally scheduled to host the 2022 competition.

Competition format
The competition is generally held every October. Runners compete on public roads which have been closed off to traffic specifically for the event. Prize money varies from US$30,000 to US$3000.

Records

Medalists
Key

Men

Individual

Team competition

Women

Individual

Team competition

†: In 2009, the team from Russia was initially ranked 3rd (3:31:23), but fell behind Japan after the disqualification of Inga Abitova.  Her competition results were annulled, beginning October 10, 2009, because of breaking anti-doping regulations.

Junior men

Individual

Team competition

References
General
 IAAF World Half Marathon Championships Copenhagen 2014 Facts & Figures Incorporating the IAAF World Half Marathon Championships (1992-2005/2008-2010-2012) IAAF World Road Running Championships 2006/2007 
 IAAF World Half Marathon Championships Individual and Team Scores
Specific

External links
Homepage

 
World Championships
Recurring sporting events established in 1992
Half marathon
Half Marathon Championships
Biennial athletics competitions